The Lower Stl'atl'imx Tribal Council is a First Nations tribal council in British Columbia, Canada, comprising four band governments of the St'at'imc (Stl'atl'imx or Lillooet) people:
 N'quat'qua First Nation
 Semahquam First Nation
 Douglas First Nation
 Skatin First Nation

The tribal council's offices are located in Mount Currie, British Columbia.

See also
Lillooet Tribal Council (St'at'imc Nation)
In-SHUCK-ch
List of tribal councils in British Columbia
St'át'timc Chiefs Council

References
 Lower Stl'atl'imx Tribal Council website
 Indian and Northern Affairs Canada information page

First Nations tribal councils in British Columbia
Lillooet Country
St'at'imc